The following is a list of notable UK garage songs which charted on any record chart, particularly the UK Singles Chart and UK Dance Singles Chart.
The list also includes songs which fall under the subgenres of 2-step garage, speed garage, bassline, breakstep and future garage.

0–9

A

B

C

D

E

F

G

H

I

J

K

L

M

N

O

P

R

S

T

U

V

W

Y

See also
UK garage
List of UK garage artists

References

 
UK garage